La Perdida is an alternative comic book series created by Jessica Abel and published by Fantagraphics. It was collected into graphic novel form by Pantheon Books, and has received a positive critical response.

Publication history 
La Perdida #1 debuted in August 2001 and new issues came out every year until 2005. Abel revised the text for its compilation and publication in 2006 as a 288-page hardcover volume by Pantheon.

Content
La Perdida is centered on the life of a young Mexican-American woman, Carla Olivares, raised by her Anglo mother, who moves on a whim to Mexico City to search for her identity. (Although Abel herself lived in Mexico City for two years [1998–2000] with her (now) husband Matt Madden, the story is not autobiographical.) La Perdida is an expressively illustrated, emotional/relationship-based comic with strong cultural overtones. 

During her stay in Mexico City as an American expatriate attempting to gain a greater knowledge of her Mexican heritage, Carla encounters a variety of people, eventually rejecting her role within the expatriate social hierarchy and attempting to achieve a more authentic experience of life as an "ordinary" citizen of Mexico.  Her encounters prove time and time again, however, that the dismissal of her background is not easily achieved and she eventually reconciles with the universality of human nature (in controversion to her initial notions of authenticity).  Along the way, she confronts the complexities of an age-old civilization, upheavals of conflicting politics, and the criminal undercurrents of Mexico City.

Style
Abel's style of rendering is an expressive ink-and-brush method, emphasizing persons over objects.  Abel devotes care, however, to depicting accurate and enthralling environments, as well as her complex characterizations of expression.  Although the black & white brush technique has been used in other graphic novels to great effect (notably Frank Miller's Sin City or Jeff Smith's Bone), Abel's usage achieves and effect perhaps most credibly comparable to that of Art Spiegelman's Maus.  Tight panels and gutters, often crowded with speech bubbles, identifies Abel's primary allegiance to dialogue in her works; this careful attention is supplemented further by her use of Spanish punctuation and vocabulary in her work (complete with glossary).

See also

 List of feminist comic books
 Portrayal of women in comics

References

External links
 

2001 comics debuts
2006 graphic novels
Comic book limited series
Comics about women
Feminist comics
Harvey Award winners for Best New Series
Pantheon Books comics titles